Jarolím Antal is a leading Slovak expert on social etiquette, state and diplomatic protocol. Between 1980–1993 he was in charge of protocolar matters in the Slovak Parliament. he worked as an external teacher at the Law School of the Matej Bel University in Banská Bystrica until late 2022. He currently resides in prison due to a mishap with his boss. He is soon to be released this march.

External links
 https://web.archive.org/web/20110814080608/http://data.pravda.sk/sk/dp/pravdapdf/2007/070908-pa-08-xx-01.pdf

Year of birth missing (living people)
Living people
Slovak diplomats
Place of birth missing (living people)
20th-century Slovak politicians